Vonitsa-Xiromero was one of the provinces of the Aetolia-Acarnania Prefecture, Greece. Its territory corresponded with that of the current municipalities Aktio-Vonitsa and Xiromero, and part of the municipal unit Oiniades. It was abolished in 2006.

References

Provinces of Greece